The 1982–83 Yugoslav Ice Hockey League season was the 41st season of the Yugoslav Ice Hockey League, the top level of ice hockey in Yugoslavia. Seven teams participated in the league, and Olimpija have won the championship.

First round

Final round

Final
Olimpija – Jesenice 2–1 (4–5, 8–5, 9–3)

Placing round

External links
Season on hokej.snt.cz

Yugoslav
Yugoslav Ice Hockey League seasons
1982–83 in Yugoslav ice hockey